The Welsh International Open is a defunct WTA Tour affiliated tennis tournament played in 1997, 12–18 May. It was held in Cardiff in Wales and was played on outdoor clay courts.

Results

Singles

Doubles

References
 WTA Results Archive

 
Clay court tennis tournaments
Tennis tournaments in Wales
WTA Tour
Defunct tennis tournaments in the United Kingdom
1997 in Welsh sport
May 1997 sports events in the United Kingdom